Robert Edward Davis (September 11, 1933 – December 22, 2001) was an American professional baseball pitcher who appeared in parts of two seasons in Major League Baseball, in  and , for the Kansas City Athletics. He was born in New York City.

Early life 
An alumnus of the Great Neck, New York, public schools, Davis, who was Jewish, attended the Loomis Chaffee School in Windsor, Connecticut, and pitched for Yale University. Davis earned a master's degree in history.

Baseball career 
Following the 1960 season, Davis was selected by the Los Angeles Angels in the 1960 Major League Baseball expansion draft for $75,000 ($ today). However, rather than report to the Angels, Davis retired and returned to Yale to continue his education.
 
In his 29 MLB games pitched, 25 of them as a reliever, Davis was winless in four decisions, with one save and an earned run average of 5.71. In 63 innings pitched, he allowed 76 hits and 34 bases on balls, striking out 50.

References

External links

1933 births
2001 deaths
Burlington A's players
Columbia Gems players
Dallas Rangers players
Jewish American baseball players
Jewish Major League Baseball players
Kansas City Athletics players
Little Rock Travelers players
Loomis Chaffee School alumni
Major League Baseball pitchers
Portland Beavers players
Savannah A's players
Shreveport Sports players
Baseball players from New York City
Yale Bulldogs baseball players
Yale University alumni
20th-century American Jews